Kleinpoort is a small village station in the Eastern Cape province of South Africa.

References

Populated places in the Sunday's River Valley Local Municipality